Sad Robots is an EP released by the Canadian band Stars. It was released on September 1, 2008 on digital download.  It is also available as a physical CD through their website, as well as during their fall 2008 tour. The album cover and merchandise for Stars' 2008–9 tour features the comic robot character Boilerplate.

Track listing

References

External links
 

2008 EPs
Stars (Canadian band) albums